A  naming ceremony is a stage at which a person or persons is officially assigned a name. The methods of the practice differ over cultures and religions. The timing at which a name is assigned can vary from some days after birth to several months or many years.

In religions and cultures

Christianity 

Naming a child, popularly referred to as "Christening", is usually through the baptism ceremony in Christianity, especially Catholic culture, and to a lesser degree among those Protestants who practice infant baptism. In Eastern Orthodoxy infants are traditionally named on the eighth day of life in a special service conducted either in the home or in church. Often, Christians will adhere to local traditions of the land in which they were born. For example, in Kerala, the traditional Hindu custom of tying an aranjanam is followed even in Christian families. In the Church of Jesus Christ of Latter-day Saints infants are traditionally given a name and a blessing on the first Sunday of the month after they are born by the child's father if he holds priesthood authority to do so and if the ordinance has been authorized by his local ecclesiastical leader. The timing may be adapted according to family circumstances.

Hinduism 

In Hinduism, the ceremony is traditionally known as Namakarana or the Namakarana Samskara, this ceremony is conducted in an elaborative form on the 12th day after birth. In Kerala, this is conducted on the 28th day and called the Noolukettu.

In Nepal, the naming ceremony is known as Nwaran. In the Hindu tradition, the Nwaran is celebrated on the 11th day (for girls and boys) from the day of birth. This ceremony is performed to give a birth name to a child, according to their lunar horoscope, which is usually not the name by which they are known. Typically, a priest is invited to perform the ceremony at home, who finds the child's lunar horoscope from his birth details, as the mother is still recovering at home with the child. It is also known as Machabu Byakegu in Newari. It takes place on the 11th day. This ceremony is performed to give a birth name to a child according to his/her lunar horoscope, this is usually not the name by which he/she will be known. This ceremony is normally small and celebrated amongst close family. The name assigned in that day may not be the child's official name. That name is usually reserved for religious activities and horoscope. The next ceremony that succeeds nwaran ceremony is the pasni (celebration).

The Chhathi Ceremony is performed when the baby is six days old. This ceremony is primarily for women and is timed to take place late at night, say between ten o'clock and midnight. According to folklore, there was a belief that on the 6th day after the birth of the child, Vidhata (a goddess of destiny) would quietly enter the house around midnight to pen the destiny of the newborn. Traditionally the mother of the newborn lights a lamp (diya). This lamp along with a red pen and paper are placed on a wooden plank for Vidhata to write the future of the newborn. The mother, while holding the newborn in her arms, kneels before the lamp, which is supposed to symbolize Vidhata.  The baby can also be named on this day.

The Namakarma Samskara is usually held after the first 11 nights of a baby's delivery. These 11 post-natal days are considered as a period during which the child is adjusting to the new environment and thus very vulnerable to infections. To ensure this, the mother and child are separated from the rest of the family during these 10 days where no one except a helper/mother's mother is allowed to touch the baby or the mother. All festivals and events in the family and extended family are postponed by 11 nights. After those 11 nights, the house is decorated and sanctified for the ceremony. The mother and child are bathed traditionally and are prepared for the ceremony. This is most likely to avoid infecting baby or mother. Relatives and close friends are invited to be a part of this occasion and bless the child. Priests are called and an elaborate ritual takes place.

The people involved in the baby naming ceremony are the parents of the newborn, the paternal and maternal grandparents and few close relatives and friends. In Maharashtra, Bengal, and among the Rajputs of Gujarat the paternal aunt has the honour of naming her brother's child. The child is dressed in new clothes and the mother wets the head of the baby with drops of water as a symbol of purifying the child. In some communities, the baby is then handed over to the paternal grandmother or the father who sits near the priest during the ritual. Where the paternal aunt names the child, she whispers the newborn his or her name in the ear and then announces it to the gathered family and friends. In some communities or families, the sacred fire is lighted and the priest chants sacred hymns to invoke the deities in heaven to bless the child.

This may differ from place to place. In some parts of Northern Kerala, grandfather whispers the child name and we can also see the child's father naming the child and maternal uncle also. These function change from place to place. On this day baby is put into a cradle for the first time.
In Kerala, a black thread and gold chain called an aranjanam are tied around the baby's waist on the 28th day. In certain parts of the state, it is performed on the 27th if it is a baby boy. The child's eyes are lined with mayye or kanmashi (kohl). A black spot is placed on one cheek or asymmetrically on the forehead, to ward off the evil eyes. The grandfather whispers the chosen Hindu name in the child's right ear three times while the left ear is covered with a betel leaf. This is then repeated with the left ear. A mixture of ghee (melted and clarified butter) or honey is given to the infant as a base for its various foods in the future. At some places, an arati is performed for seven times with a lamp thread in a leaf.

According to the date and time of birth of the child, a particular letter of the Sanskrit alphabet associated with the child's solar birth sign (Surya Rashi) is chosen which would prove lucky for the baby. The baby is then given a name starting with that letter. Usually the grandfather whispers the name four times in the right ear of the baby. In Maharashtra, this is performed by the paternal aunt. The baby receives blessings from all, including the priests. An elaborate feast is organized for the priests and the guests, as a closing event of the ceremony.

The Namakarana Samskara is also performed on adult converts to Hinduism to mark their formal initiation into Hinduism. The convert chooses a Hindu name to declare his allegiance to Hinduism and his severance from his former religion. A Vedic fire sacrifice is then performed and the convert writes his new name in a tray of uncooked rice.

In Maharashtra, traditionally, women changed their birth-name upon marriage. The new name was selected by the husband to complement his own name. For example, a groom named Vishnu would change his bride's name to Lakshmi, the consort of Vishnu, Ramachandra would change his bride's name to Sita, and so on. Usually the husband writes the new name in a plate filled with dry uncooked rice grains.

Humanism 
Some secular humanists perform a naming ceremony as a non-religious alternative to ceremonies such as christening. The purpose is to recognise and celebrate the arrival of a child and welcome him or her in the family and circle of friends. The structure often reflects that of more traditional naming ceremonies, with a formal ceremony led by a humanist celebrant in which the parents name 'guide parents', 'mentors' or 'supporting adults' instead of godparents. This is often followed by a celebratory party.

Islam 

In Islam, the baby is named on the seventh day by the mother and father who make a decision together on what the child should be called. They choose an appropriate name, with a positive meaning. Aqiqah takes place on the seventh day also, this is a celebration which involves the slaughter of sheep. Sheep are sacrificed and the meat is distributed to relatives and neighbours and given to the poor. If the father does not have enough funds, he may do it anytime in the future as long as it is done in general.

In Turkish traditions, the paternal grandfather whispers adhan (call to prayer) into the right ear of the baby and afterward repeats or tells the chosen name of the newborn baby three times.

Judaism

In the Jewish tradition, baby boys are named at a brit milah on the eighth day after their birth. Girls are named within the first two weeks. Common Ashkenazi custom maintains that girls should be named when the father is called up to the Torah on a Torah reading day closest or close to when the girl is born, although practice often has baby girls named at the Torah reading on the first Shabbat following birth. A resurgence in recent generations of the less popular simchat bat ceremony for naming baby girls has recently taken hold in many modern Orthodox Ashkenazi communities.

Wicca 
In Wiccan religion, at the initiation (or dedication) ritual, initiates take a Wiccan Name (Craft Name). This name is not used in public, but only among other Wiccans in religious gatherings. Some Wiccan authors use their Wiccan name on their books, such as Silver RavenWolf. For a Wiccan, taking a Wiccan name symbolizes a rebirth.

Druidism 
In Druidism, the naming ceremony may sometimes be called, "The First Oath"  and is used similarly in Wiccan.  The name is usually referred to as a 'Holy Name' or 'Druid Name'.  The First Oath may be used in private, if one may choose to be solitary, but it sometimes customary to have a witness or members of the hearth or grove with which they are involved, participate in the oath.  This First Oath may be something said within a Naming Ritual or Ceremony or simply used the right itself.  Something totally different than this may be said:"I, [state your civil name], choose the name [state your druid or holy name] to honor the Kindred who include the Deities, Nature Spirits and Ancestors.  I declare myself to be Druid, a seeker of the old ways, and one who sees value in and of Tree Dryads, within and around Earth Mother, before and beyond Time Father.  I wish that my path and the path I have been called to, be declared as one.  As I set my foot upon this path, I promise Source of All Things, to use our Energies to bring love and light to all living things.  I will study so that I gain much knowledge of those who came before me and open myself to their benign will.  With this name, I [state your druid or holy name] also known as [state your civil name] become one as I strive for hospitality, courage, and vision so that I may bring bright blessings to those around me."

See also 
 Civil naming ceremony
 Dies lustricus
 Deadnaming

References